Wahl Justice Bartmann  (born 13 June 1963) is a former South African rugby union player.

Playing career
Bartmann matriculated in 1981 and represented the South African Schools team in the same year. In 1982 Bartmann enrolled at the Rand Afrikaans University (RAU), in Johannesburg and made his debut for Transvaal as a nineteen year old. His two brothers, Leon and Francois, also represented Transvaal at provincial level. Bartmann also played for Natal and captained the team 45 times and was part of the team that won the Currie Cup in 1990 and 1992.

Bartmann made his test debut for the Springboks against the visiting New Zealand Cavaliers on 10 May 1986 at Newlands in Cape Town. In so doing, Bartmann became the first alumnus of RAU to receive Springbok colours for rugby. He toured with the Springboks to Argentina in 1993 and to New Zealand in 1994, but did not play in any test matches on these tours. He played eight tests without scoring any tries for the Springboks and also played in seven tour matches, scoring one try.

Test history

Accolades
Bartmann was voted South Africa rugby player of the Year for two consecutive years, 1990 and 1991.

See also
List of South Africa national rugby union players – Springbok no. 545

References

1963 births
Living people
South African rugby union players
South Africa international rugby union players
Golden Lions players
Sharks (Currie Cup) players
Rugby union players from Gauteng
Rugby union flankers